Shenggen Fan (樊胜根) was the Director General of the International Food Policy Research Institute (IFPRI) between 2009 and 2019.

He is known for his work on transition economies and rural development in China. His research has focused on analysis of the role of public and private investments in agriculture and public infrastructure in the fight against chronic poverty and hunger. In addition to his work on his home country, he has also worked extensively in other Asian countries, and East Africa.

Education
He earned his bachelor's and master's degrees from Nanjing Agricultural University in China. In 1989, he graduated from the College of Agricultural, Food, and Environmental Sciences of the University of Minnesota with a Ph.D. in applied economics. His research was the first to separately measure the effects of the green revolution promoted by international agricultural research, technological change, and institutional changes in China, on the productivity of the Chinese agricultural system.

Career 
After completing his PhD, he was a post-doctoral fellow and associate research officer at the International Service for National Agricultural Research (ISNAR) in The Hague, Netherlands from 1990-1992, and then a research economist at the Department of Agricultural Economics and Rural Sociology, University of Arkansas, Fayetteville.  From there, he joined IFPRI in 1995.

At IFPRI, he was successively
 1995–1998: Research Fellow at IFPRI
 1998–2005: Senior Research Fellow and team leader of public investment at IFPRI
 2005–2009: Division Director of IFPRI's Development Strategy and Governance Division .
 Since 2009: Director General of the International Food Policy Research Institute (IFPRI), Washington, DC.

Other activities
Fan has received the Outstanding Alumni Award in Applied Economics and the Distinguished Leadership Award for Internationals in 2006 (both from the University of Minnesota).

He is a member of the Executive Committee of the International Association of Agricultural Economists and has been on the editorial boards of Food Policy (UK), 2002–Present. Journal of Chinese Rural Economy, China, 2001–Present and  Review of Agricultural Economics, USA, 2001–2002

Fan is a member of the Leadership Council of Compact2025, an initiative for ending hunger and undernutrition by 2025.

Since 2004, Fan is an adjunct fellow of the Institute of Indian Dalit Studies, New Delhi.

Dr. Shenggen Fan is on the Board of Trustees of the University of Central Asia.

Awards
Fan received the 2017 Fudan Management Excellence Award, which recognizes individuals who have made outstanding contributions to the field of management.

Publications
Fan has published 32 peer-reviewed journal articles, which were cited over 250 times.

He has also edited or (co-)authored 7 books:
 Fan, Shenggen; Zhang, Linxiu (2003). WTO and rural public investment strategy in China [in Chinese]. Beijing: China Agricultural Publishing House.
 Fan, Shenggen; Zhong, Funing; Wen, Simei (2005). Globalization and small farm-holders. Beijing: China Agricultural Publishing House.
 Fan, Shenggen; Chan-Kang, Connie (2006). Road development, economic growth, and poverty reduction [in Chinese]. Beijing: China Agricultural Publishing House.
 Fan, Shenggen; Gulati, Ashok (2007). The dragon and the elephant : Agricultural and rural reforms in China and India. Baltimore, Maryland: Johns Hopkins University Press.
 Fan, Shenggen (2008). Public expenditures, growth, and poverty in developing countries: Lessons from developing countries. Baltimore, Maryland: Johns Hopkins University Press.
 
 Fan, Shenggen; Zhang, Xiaobo; de Haan, Arjan (2010). Narratives of Chinese economic reforms: How does China cross the river? Singapore: World Scientific.

References

External links
 Profile on the IFPRI website
 Publication summary on Scopus
 Presentations on Slideshare

Chinese agronomists
University of Minnesota College of Food, Agricultural and Natural Resource Sciences alumni
Living people
Chinese science writers
Year of birth missing (living people)